Juan Emmanuel Acuña Muñoz or Juan Acuña (born March 31, 1987) is a Paraguayan footballer who currently plays as a striker for Barito Putera in Indonesia Super League.

Club

Barito Putera
On 27 February 2014 Juan Acuña has officially joined the Barito Putera for the duration of one season.

External links
 Profile at soccerway.com
 Profile at ligaindonesia.co.id

References

1987 births
Living people
Paraguayan footballers
Paraguayan expatriate footballers
Association football forwards
Paraguayan expatriate sportspeople in Indonesia
Expatriate footballers in Indonesia
Liga 1 (Indonesia) players
PS Barito Putera players